Asimina is a genus of small trees or shrubs described as a genus in 1763. Asimina is the only temperate genus in the tropical and subtropical flowering plant family Annonaceae.

Asimina has large, simple leaves and large fruit. It is native to eastern North America and collectively referred to as pawpaw. The genus includes the widespread common pawpaw Asimina triloba, which bears the largest edible fruit indigenous to the United States. Pawpaws are native to 26 states of the U.S. and to Ontario in Canada. The common pawpaw is a patch-forming (clonal) understory tree found in well-drained, deep, fertile bottomland and hilly upland habitat. Pawpaws are in the same plant family (Annonaceae) as the custard apple, cherimoya, sweetsop, soursop, and ylang-ylang;  the genus is the only member of that family not confined to the tropics.

Names

The genus name Asimina was first described and named by Michel Adanson, a French naturalist of Scottish descent. The name is adapted from the Native American name assimin through the French colonial asiminier.

The common name (American) pawpaw, also spelled paw paw, paw-paw, and papaw, probably derives from the Spanish papaya, perhaps because of the superficial similarity of their fruits.

Description

The northern, cold-tolerant common pawpaw (A. triloba) is deciduous, while the southern species are often evergreen.

The flowers of pawpaws are produced singly or in clusters of up to eight together; they are large, 4–6 cm across, perfect, with three sepals and six petals (three large outer petals, three smaller inner petals). The petal color varies from white to purple or red-brown.

It has a flavor somewhat similar to both banana and mango, varying significantly by cultivar, and has more protein than most fruits.

Species and their distributions
Accepted species
 Asimina angustifolia Raf. 1840 not A. Gray 1886; Florida, Georgia, Alabama, South Carolina Regarded as a synonym of A. longifolia by some authorities.
 Asimina incana (W. Bartram) Exell – woolly pawpaw. Florida and Georgia.  (Annona incana W. Bartram)
 Asimina longifolia Raf. – slimleaf pawpaw. Florida, Georgia, and Alabama.
 Asimina manasota DeLaney – Manasota papaw native to two counties in Florida (Manatee + Sarasota); first described in 2010 Not recognized by some authorities.
 Asimina pulchella (Small)Rehder & Dayton – white squirrel banana. Endemic to 3 counties in Florida. (endangered)
Asimina rugelii  B.L. Rob – yellow squirrel banana. Endemic to Volusia county Florida (endangered)
 Asimina obovata (Willd.) Nash) (Annona obovata Willd.) – Flag-pawpaw or Bigflower pawpaw – Florida 
 Asimina parviflora (Michx.) Dunal – smallflower pawpaw. Southern states from Texas to Virginia.
 Asimina pygmaea (W. Bartram) Dunal – dwarf pawpaw. Florida and Georgia.
 Asimina reticulata Shuttlw. ex Chapman – netted pawpaw. Florida and Georgia.
 Asimina spatulata (Kral) D.B.Ward – slimleaf pawpaw. Florida and Alabama Regarded as a synonym by some authorities.
 Asimina tetramera Small – fourpetal pawpaw. Florida (endangered)
 Asimina triloba (L.) Dunal – common pawpaw. Extreme southern Ontario, Canada, and the eastern United States from New York west to southeast Nebraska, and south to northern Florida and eastern Texas.  (Annona triloba L.)

Ecology 
The common pawpaw is native to shady, rich bottom lands, where it often forms a dense undergrowth in the forest, often appearing as a patch or thicket of individual, small, slender trees.

Pawpaw flowers are insect-pollinated, but fruit production is limited since few if any pollinators are attracted to the flower's faint, or sometimes nonexistent scent. The flowers produce an odor similar to that of rotting meat to attract blowflies or carrion beetles for cross pollination. Other insects that are attracted to pawpaw plants include scavenging fruit flies, carrion flies and beetles. Because of difficult pollination, some believe the flowers are self-incompatible.

Pawpaw fruit may be eaten by foxes, opossums, squirrels, and raccoons. Pawpaw leaves and twigs are seldom consumed by rabbits or deer.

The leaves, twigs, and bark of the common pawpaw tree contain natural insecticides known as acetogenins.

Larvae of the zebra swallowtail butterfly feed exclusively on young leaves of the various pawpaw species, but never occur in great numbers on the plants.

The pawpaw is considered an evolutionary anachronism, where a now-extinct evolutionary partner, such as a Pleistocene megafauna species, formerly consumed the fruit and assisted in seed dispersal.

Cultivation and uses

Wild-collected fruits of the common pawpaw (A. triloba) have long been a favorite treat throughout the tree's extensive native range in eastern North America. Pawpaws have never been cultivated for fruit on the scale of apples and peaches, but interest in pawpaw cultivation has increased in recent decades. Fresh pawpaw fruits are commonly eaten raw; however, they do not store or ship well unless frozen. Other methods of preservation include dehydration, production of jams or jellies, and pressure canning.The fruit pulp is also often used locally in baked dessert recipes, with pawpaw often substituted in many banana-based recipes.

The pawpaw is also gaining in popularity among backyard gardeners because of the tree's distinctive growth habit, the appeal of its fresh fruit, and its relatively low maintenance needs once established. The common pawpaw is also of interest in ecological restoration plantings, since this tree grows well in wet soil and has a strong tendency to form well-rooted clonal thickets.

The several other species of Asimina have few economic uses.

History
The earliest documentation of pawpaws is in the 1541 report of the Spanish de Soto expedition, who found Native Americans cultivating it east of the Mississippi River. Chilled pawpaw fruit was a favorite dessert of George Washington, and Thomas Jefferson planted it at his home in Virginia, Monticello. The Lewis and Clark Expedition sometimes subsisted on pawpaws during their travels. Daniel Boone was also a consumer and fan of the pawpaw. The common pawpaw was designated as the Ohio state native fruit in 2009. Numerous pawpaw festivals have celebrated the plant and its fruit.

See also
 List of cherimoya cultivars
 Atemoya (a cross of A. squamosa and A. cherimola)
 Soursop (Annona muricata)
 Sugar-apple (Annona squamosa)
 White sapote (Casimiroa edulis)  sometimes mislabeled as cherimoya
 Wild soursop (Annona senegalensis)
 Wild sweetsop (Annona reticulata)

References

External links

USDA distribution of Pawpaw
Pawpaw Information  from Kentucky State University
Asimina Genetic Resources - Pawpaw
Clark's September 18, 1806 journal entry about pawpaws
Asimina triloba - Brooklyn Botanical Garden 
Pawpaw Wines 
Pawpaw Festival, Athens, Ohio

 
Annonaceae genera
Trees of North America 
Cuisine of the Southern United States
Taxa named by Michel Adanson
Fruit trees
Crops originating from indigenous Americans